38th NSFC Awards
January 3, 2004

Best Film: 
 American Splendor 

The 38th National Society of Film Critics Awards, given on 3 January 2004, honored the best in film for 2003.

Winners

Best Picture 
1. American Splendor
2. Mystic River
3. Lost in Translation

Best Director 
1. Clint Eastwood – Mystic River
2. Peter Jackson – The Lord of the Rings: The Return of the King
3. Sofia Coppola – Lost in Translation

Best Actor 
1. Bill Murray – Lost in Translation
2. Sean Penn – Mystic River
3. Paul Giamatti – American Splendor

Best Actress 
1. Charlize Theron – Monster
2. Hope Davis – American Splendor and The Secret Lives of Dentists
3. Naomi Watts – 21 Grams

Best Supporting Actor 
1. Peter Sarsgaard – Shattered Glass
2. Tim Robbins – Mystic River
3. Alec Baldwin – The Cooler

Best Supporting Actress 
1. Patricia Clarkson – Pieces of April and The Station Agent
2. Maria Bello – The Cooler
3. Shohreh Aghdashloo – House of Sand and Fog

Best Screenplay 
1. Shari Springer Berman and Robert Pulcini – American Splendor
2. Brian Helgeland – Mystic River
3. Craig Lucas – The Secret Lives of Dentists

Best Cinematography 
1. Russell Boyd – Master and Commander: The Far Side of the World
2. Lance Acord – Lost in Translation
3. Harris Savides – Elephant

Best Foreign Language Film 
1. The Man Without a Past (Mies vailla menneisyyttä)
2. The Triplets of Belleville (Les triplettes de Belleville)
3. Unknown Pleasures (Rèn xiāo yáo)

Best Non-Fiction Film 
1. To Be and to Have (Être et avoir)
2. The Fog of War
3. Spellbound

Film Heritage Awards 
 Kino on Video for its excellent DVD collections of F. W. Murnau, Erich von Stroheim, and the American Film Theatre Series
 Milestone Film & Video for its exemplary theatrical and/or DVD presentations of Michael Powell's The Edge of the World, Rupert Julian's The Phantom of the Opera, E. A. Dupont's Piccadilly, André Antoine's La Terre, and Mad Love, the films of Yevgeni Bauer.

References

External links
 Past Awards

2003 film awards
2003
2004 in American cinema